Cliff House may refer to:

Canada 
 Cliff House, Edmonton, Alberta, Edmonton's smallest laneway house

England 
 Cliff House, Ipswich, Suffolk, home of Thomas Cobbold (1708–1767)
 Cliff House, Marske-by-the-Sea, North Yorkshire, summer residence of Joseph Pease (1799–1872)

India 
 Cliff House (Kerala), the official residence of the Chief Minister of Kerala

United States 
 Cliff House (San Francisco, California), a restaurant
 Cliff House (Manitou Springs, Colorado), listed on the NRHP in El Paso County, Colorado
 Cliff Cottage, Southbridge, Massachusetts, listed on the NRHP in Massachusetts
 Z. E. Cliff House, Somerville, Massachusetts, listed on the NRHP in Massachusetts